The Skirmish off the coast of Abkhazia was a naval engagement between warships of the Russian Black Sea Fleet of the Russian Navy and the Georgian Navy during the Russo-Georgian War.

The engagement 
According to Centre for Analysis of Strategies and Technologies, ships of the Russian Black Sea Fleet left their base in Sevastopol, Ukraine, on the evening of 8 August. On 10 August RIA Novosti – quoting a source in the Russian Navy headquarters – reported that a group of Russian warships had arrived at the maritime border with Georgia in the eastern part of the Black Sea. According to the source, the vessel Moskva, accompanied by a patrol vessel and supply ships, travelled from Sevastopol. They would join three large landing ships that had earlier arrived in the area from Sevastopol and from Novorossiysk. "The purpose of the Black Sea Fleet vessels' presence in this region is to provide aid to refugees", the source said. The source denied media reports that the warships were enforcing a blockade of Georgia's coast. "A blockade of the coastline would mean war with Georgia, and we are not in a state of war with Georgia." Abkhaz officials said that several Georgian warships had attempted on 9 August to approach the coast of Abkhazia, but the attempts were curbed by the Russian ships.

On 10 August a naval skirmish between the Russian ships and several Georgian naval vessels took place. According to the Russian Ministry of Defence, four Georgian fast missile boats breached the "security zone" declared around the Russian Navy ships off Abkhazia. After an attempt at hailing the intruding units, the Russian units opened fire with artillery, sinking one of the ships and forcing the remaining three Georgian boats to withdraw towards the port of Poti. The Russian navy earlier said that Russian warships originally said to be near the Georgian coast had put into Novorossiysk. This action constituted the Russian Navy's first real sea battle since 1945.

Russian media reported that a naval battle took place on 10 August 2008. The ITAR-Tass news agency quoted a ministry spokesman as saying that Georgian missile patrol boats twice tried to attack Russian ships. According to a sailor interviewed in Sevastopol on 13 August, a Georgian vessel was struck and sunk in 300 m of water by P-120 Malakhit (SS-N-9 'Siren') missile, fired allegedly by the guided missile corvette MRK Mirazh. Furthermore, the sailor claimed that a second ship was also damaged during the battle. He said that the vessel sunk in action was the missile boat Tbilisi. It is reported that the vessel disappeared from the surface within 90 seconds in 300 meters of water. Russian media also reported that the sunk Georgian vessel was Tbilisi. However, this was disputed. It was suggested that the destroyed vessel was the P-21 patrol boat Giorgi Toreli.

Russian Navy operations
According to Georgian sources, the Russian navy that moved toward Georgia, comprised the following vessels:
 Ropucha-class landing ships Tsezar Kunikov and Yamal.
 Alligator-class landing ship Saratov.
 Albatros-class Anti-Submarine Corvettes Kasimov, Povarino and Suzdalets.
 Moma Class Surveillance ship Ekvator.
 Natya-class minesweepers Zhukov and Turbinist.
 Nanuchka-class corvette Mirazh.
 Bora-class guided missile hovercraft Samum (Breeze)
 Small Landing Ship Koida
 Sorum Class Fleet Tug MB-31.
 Kashin-class destroyer Smetlivyy
 Slava-class cruiser Moskva.
 Alrosa B-871 which landed in Suhumi

According to PONARS Eurasia, a total of 13 ships were headed towards the Georgian coast, including the Slava-class cruiser Moskva, the Kashin-class destroyer Smetlivyy, several Grisha-class corvettes (Suzdalets, Aleksandrovsk, Muromets, and possibly Kasimov), the Nanuchka-class missile ship Mirazh, two patrol craft, three amphibious landing craft (two Ropucha-class, Tsezar Kunikov and Yamal, and one Alligator-class, Saratov), two mine warfare ships (Admiral Zheleznyakov and Turbinist), the transport ship General Ryabikov, and the tugboat Epron.

The Georgian coast was blockaded by vessels of the Russian Black Sea Fleet on 10 August 2008. According to Interfax news agency citing Russian navy source, the blockading units were assigned the task to not allow arms and military hardware supplies to reach Georgia by sea. Ukraine, where the ships were based, warned Russia that it had the right to bar the ships from coming back to port because of their mission.

Georgia has not acknowledged the loss of a patrol boat and does not mention any naval skirmish with the Russian navy. The Black Sea Fleet, according to the Georgian Foreign Ministry statement, landed 4,000 troops in Ochamchire. It then went on to attack Georgian troops deployed at Kodori Gorge. According to the Georgian source, a missile attack was launched against an inland target in Kodori. Russians appeared in Poti on 12 August 2008. All the naval vessels there, which were Coast Guard Border Police patrol vessels, were mined and exploded.

While the war started on Friday 8 August, the Black Sea Fleet reportedly arrived off the coast of Georgia on Saturday 9 August. While the distance from Sevastopol to Ochamchire is about 400 nautical miles, the Russian convoy (including Moskva, Smetlivyy, Muromets, and Aleksandrovets) sailed from Sevastopol with an assortment of support vessels that could only make 12-16 knots at best. It was suggested that was a 25-hour trip at best, meaning the ships would have departed from Sevastopol almost immediately after the war began. Some analysts even suggested that these ships may have left base before the outbreak of the war.

Aftermath
Ukrainian authorities declared that they were ready to discuss with Russians the return of ships of the Russian Black Sea Fleet to Crimea.

The commanding officer of the corvette Mirazh, Captain, 3rd rank Ivan Dubik, was received in Moscow by President of Russia Dmitry Medvedev, who awarded him a military medal, along with other members of the Russian armed forces.

See also

References

Abkhazia
Maritime incidents in 2008
Military history of the Black Sea
August 2008 events in Asia
History of Moldova
Abkhazia
Russo-Georgian War
2008 in Abkhazia
Abkhazia
Abkhaz Coast